Halegrapha masoniana is a species of corticolous lichen in the family Graphidaceae. Found in Sri Lanka, it was formally described as a new species in 2014 by lichenologists Gothamie Weerakoon, Robert Lücking, and Helge Thorsten Lumbsch. It is only known to occur at the type locality. The specific epithet honours American lichenologist Mason Hale, "for his important contributions to lichenology in Sri Lanka".

The main characteristics of Halegrapha masoniana that distinguish it from other members of its genus include the interspersed hymenium, the presence of norstictic acid, and the relatively large ascospores, measuring 50–70 by 8–10 μm.

References

Graphidaceae
Lichen species
Lichens of Sri Lanka
Lichens described in 2014
Taxa named by Helge Thorsten Lumbsch
Taxa named by Robert Lücking
Taxa named by Gothamie Weerakoon